Maly Meneuz (Kese Mänäwez) is a rural locality (a selo) in Mikhaylovsky Selsoviet, Bizhbulyaksky District, Bashkortostan, Russia. The population was 180 as of 2010. There are 3 streets.

Geography 
Maly Meneuz is located 44 km north of Bizhbulyak (the district's administrative centre) by road. Svetlovka is the nearest rural locality.

References 

Rural localities in Bizhbulyaksky District